Poecilotheria is a genus of tarantulas native to India and Sri Lanka. It was first described by Eugène Louis Simon in 1885. They are arboreal tarantulas, commonly known as ornamental tarantulas, known for their vivid color patterns, fast movement, and potent venom compared to other tarantulas.  all species are protected under CITES.

The genus name is a combination of the Ancient Greek "poikilos", meaning "spotted", and therion", meaning "wild beast".

Taxonomy
The species belonging to Poecilotheria were first documented in 1734 by Dutch zoologist Albertus Seba, when he went to Sri Lanka. He published the new spiders he saw in his illustrations of the book Albertus Seba's Thesaurus under the name of Aranea maxima ceilonica (meaning big spider from Sri Lanka). However, the most precise scientific explanation came in 1804 when Pierre Latreille described the spider as Mygale fasciata.

After about 40 years delay, in 1850, C.L. Koch revised the generic name Mygale in to Scurria and species as Scurria fasciata. In 1885, Eugène Simon proposed the generic name Poecilotheria instead of Scurria due to species description errors with a mollusk.

There is a debate about the taxonomy of a few species. Some sources identify Poecilotheria vittata of Sri Lanka as a synonym of Poecilotheria striata of India, but in other sources both of them have been given valid species identity. The naming of Poecilotheria bara from Sri Lanka is also in debate – whether it is the same species as Poecilotheria subfusca,  found in south central parts of Sri Lanka. In 2014, Ranil P. Nanayakkara, a Sri Lanka arachnologist, regarded P. vittata, P. striata, P. bara, and P. subfusca as distinct species.

Species
, the World Spider Catalog accepted the following species, seven from India, six from Sri Lanka and two from both countries.

India
Poecilotheria formosa Pocock, 1899 — Salem ornamental
Poecilotheria metallica Pocock, 1899 — Gooty sapphire ornamental
Poecilotheria miranda Pocock, 1900 — Bengal spotted ornamental
Poecilotheria regalis Pocock, 1899 — Indian Ornamental
Poecilotheria rufilata Pocock, 1899 — red slate ornamental
Poecilotheria striata Pocock, 1895 — Mysore ornamental, Pedersen's ghost ornamental
Poecilotheria tigrinawesseli Smith, 2006 — Wessel's tiger ornamental

Sri Lanka

Poecilotheria fasciata (Latreille, 1804) (type species) — Sri Lankan ornamental
Poecilotheria ornata Pocock, 1899 — fringed ornamental
Poecilotheria rajaei Nanayakkara, et al., 2012 — Mankulam pink banded ornamental
Poecilotheria smithi Kirk, 1996 — yellow backed ornamental
Poecilotheria subfusca Pocock, 1895 — ivory ornamental

Both countries
Poecilotheria hanumavilasumica Smith, 2004 — Rameshwaram ornamental
Poecilotheria vittata Pocock, 1895 — Magam ornamental

Junior synonyms
The following species were once considered to be species, but are now considered synonyms of other species by the World Spider Catalog, :
Poecilotheria amarasekarai  = P. rajaei; regarded as distinct by other sources
Poecilotheria bara Chamberlin, 1917 = P. subfusca; regarded as distinct by other sources
Poecilotheria gadgili Tikader, 1977 = P. regalis
Poecilotheria nallamalaiensis Rao et al., 2006 = P. formosa
Poecilotheria pederseni Kirk, 2001 = P. vittata
Poecilotheria pococki Charpentier, 1996 = P. smithi
Poecilotheria uniformis Strand, 1913 = P. subfusca

Biology
Species of Poecilotheria are easily distinguishable from other species of family Theraphosidae due to the flattened carapace, maxilla with spines, and black teeth like tubercles. Their legs lack spines and the scopula of the legs are clearly seen. There are unique color patterns on the ventral surface, especially on the legs. The dorsal surface of the abdomen has several variegated stripes and spots of black and white. The first and fourth pair of legs are colored with striking yellow and black patterns, a feature used especially to identify up to species level.

Males and females show sexual dimorphism, which enables easy recognition. Mature males are easily recognizable by highly sclerotized sperm storage pouches called palpal bulbs. Palpal bulbs are used to inject sperm in to female's genitalia. Males are smaller than females and also more slenderly built. In males, the first pair and fourth pair of legs are of the same length, but in females, the first pair of legs are longer than the fourth pair. Males are usually more dull colored with cryptic markings and are inconspicuous. However, the folium marking on the opisthosoma is darker than that of females.

Ecology
Ornamental tarantulas are nocturnal and crepuscular hunters. They come out to forage in dusk and dawn. Unlike many other spiders, they do not use a cobweb to catch prey. Instead, they are ambush predators, where they sit and wait until the prey comes closer or passes by, then follow the prey with exceptional speed, catch it, and inject venom to immobilize it.

Once the prey is secured, they roll the prey in silk and start to feed. The most common prey of tiger spiders are insects, larvae, small birds and small mammals like bats, and even other spiders and males of the same species (by females).

Several species of Poecilotheria are classed as "endangered" or "critically endangered", with the main threats being habitat loss and for at least one species, P. metallica, collection and smuggling for the pet trade.

Conservation
As of 2019, all species of Poecilotheria are listed on CITES Appendix II. This means that specimens cannot be legally traded  (internationally) without CITES export permits from the country of export (or CITES re-export permits if the specimens had been previously imported from another country).

Photos

References

External links

 Poecilotheria pictures

 
Spiders of Asia
Theraphosidae genera